Thomas Germain (1673–1748) was the pre-eminent Parisian silversmith of the Rococo.

The son of a Paris silversmith Pierre Germain (none of whose work survives) he did not at first train in the family workshop, but began as a painter, spending the years 1687–1702 in Rome, where he turned his hand towards goldsmith's work.

Once again in Paris he received the status of maître(master) in 1720 and was appointed an orfèvre du Roi(or, per a literal translation, the title of the "King's Goldsmith"). Much of his output was to royal commissions, including a number of presentation swords given to the likes of Marshal Foch and Alain Porée, Captain of the Corsairs. His most spectacular surviving piece, a surtout de table on a hunting theme, with dogs and horns and putti, was begun in the years 1729–31 for the tax-farmer Samuel-Jacques Bernard but remained unsold at the time of Germain's death, when it was sold in 1757 to the duke of Aveiro, who took it to Portugal; it is conserved in the Museu Nacional de Arte Antiga, Lisbon. Germain's covered tureens were spectacular;  the world's record auction price for a single piece of silver was achieved by a silver tureen by him, stamped for 1733, which was sold at Sotheby New York in November 1996 for US$10,287,500. He made a pair of tureens for Evelyn Pierrepont, 2nd Duke of Kingston-upon-Hull, to designs by Juste-Aurèle Meissonnier in 1735 that Henry Hawley has said "represents the apogee of the French rococo" (Hawley 1997).

Aside from the work for the French crown he had royal patrons in the queen of Spain, the king and queen of Naples, and the king of Portugal.  Germain also did work as an architect, designing Saint-Louis-du-Louvre, a reconstruction of the collapsed Saint-Thomas-du-Louvre.

At his death, his atelier passed to his fourth son François-Thomas Germain (1726–91).  Most of his work was destroyed during the financial crises that led to the French Revolution, when rococo objects lost their value; a great deal had also already been lost during the great Lisbon earthquake of 1755.

References 

G. Bapst. Les Germains. Paris, 1887. Still the classic monograph.

External links
(Museu Nacional de Arte Antiga) Large Surtout for the portuguese Duque de Aveiro
(Getty Museum) Two pairs of tureens for portuguese families, 1726–29 and 1744
Cristina Neiva Correia, The Bernard Surtout
Henry Hawley, "Meissonnier's Kingston Tureen" Magazine Antiques January 1997.
(Museum in Belém Palace - Lisbon) Inkstand for the royal portuguese family
Museu Nacional de Arte Antiga Lisboa (Portuguese site)
(Musée du Louvre) Inkstand for the portuguese Cardinal João Cosme da Cunha, a pair of wine coolers and saltcellars from the Penthièvre-Orléans service, and a pair of sugar casters for the Duke of Bourbon.

1673 births
1748 deaths
French decorative artists
French silversmiths
Metalsmiths from Paris